Croque is a designated place on the Great Northern Peninsula in the Canadian province of Newfoundland and Labrador.

Geography 
Croque is in Newfoundland within Subdivision F of Division No. 9.

Demographics 
As a designated place in the 2021 Census of Population conducted by Statistics Canada, Croque recorded a population of 45 down from its 2016 population of 51.

See also 
List of communities in Newfoundland and Labrador
List of designated places in Newfoundland and Labrador
Newfoundland and Labrador Route 432
Newfoundland and Labrador Route 438

References 

Designated places in Newfoundland and Labrador